This article details the fixtures and results of the Indonesia national football team.

Record

Managers of 2009

Goals

Fixtures and results

References 

 Indonesia Fixtures and Results

2009
2008–09 in Indonesian football
2009–10 in Indonesian football
Indonesia

ar:منتخب إندونيسيا لكرة القدم
de:Indonesische Fußballnationalmannschaft
es:Selección de fútbol de Indonesia
fr:Équipe d'Indonésie de football
he:נבחרת אינדונזיה בכדורגל
id:Tim nasional sepak bola Indonesia
it:Nazionale di calcio dell'Indonesia
ja:サッカーインドネシア代表
ko:인도네시아 축구 국가대표팀
lt:Indonezijos vyrų futbolo rinktinė
lv:Indonēzijas futbola izlase
mr:इंडोनेशिया फुटबॉल संघ
ms:Pasukan bola sepak kebangsaan Indonesia
nl:Indonesisch voetbalelftal
pl:Reprezentacja Indonezji w piłce nożnej
pt:Seleção Indonésia de Futebol
ru:Сборная Индонезии по футболу
sv:Indonesiens fotbollslandslag
th:ฟุตบอลทีมชาติอินโดนีเซีย
tr:Endonezya Millî Futbol Takımı
vi:Đội tuyển bóng đá quốc gia Indonesia
zh:印尼國家足球隊